Claire Leroy (born 9 March 1980 in Nantes) is a French sailor. In 2007 and 2008 she won the world championships in female match racing. She was named the International Sailing Federation's female World Sailor of the Year for 2007.

Leroy competed for France at the 2012 Summer Olympics.

References

External links 

 
 
 
 

ISAF World Sailor of the Year (female)
1980 births
Living people
French female sailors (sport)
Sportspeople from Nantes
Sailors at the 2012 Summer Olympics – Elliott 6m
Olympic sailors of France
21st-century French women